Tofanelli is an Italian surname. Notable people with the surname include:

 (born 1965), Italian musician
Stefano Tofanelli (1752–1812), Italian painter

Italian-language surnames